{{Drugbox
| IUPAC_name = N-[(4-chlorophenyl)methyl]-1-[3-(3H-imidazol-4-yl)propylsulfanyl]formamidine
| image = Clobenpropit.svg

| tradename =  
| pregnancy_category =  
| legal_US = IND
| routes_of_administration =  

| bioavailability =  
| metabolism =  
| elimination_half-life =  
| excretion =  

| CAS_number = 145231-45-4
| UNII_Ref = 
| UNII = RKU631JF4H
| ATC_prefix = None
| ATC_suffix =  
| PubChem = 2790
| IUPHAR_ligand = 1223
| ChemSpiderID = 2688
| ChEMBL = 14690

| C=14 | H=17 | Cl=1 | N=4 | S=1 
| smiles = C1=CC(=CC=C1CN=C(N)SCCCC2=CN=CN2)Cl
}}Clobenpropit''' is a histamine H3 receptor antagonist. It has neuroprotective effects via stimulation of GABA release in brain cells in vitro''.

References 

H3 receptor antagonists
Imidazoles
Chloroarenes